Nikolay Borislavov Mihaylov (born 28 June 1988) is a Bulgarian professional footballer who plays as a goalkeeper for Levski Sofia, where he is also the captain, and the Bulgarian national team.

Personal life 
Mihaylov's father is former goalkeeper Borislav Mihaylov, the player with the second most international appearances for Bulgaria (after Stilyan Petrov) and head of the Bulgarian Football Union, and his grandfather was Biser Mihaylov, who also played in goal for Levski in the 1960s. Maria Petrova, a prominent world champion in rhythmic gymnastics, has been his stepmother since 1998.

Club career

Levski Sofia 
Talented Mihaylov started as a youngster with home country top team Levski Sofia, making his full 90 minutes debut at the age of just 17 in the UEFA cup match against Auxerre. He nevertheless was not popular with their fans. Mihaylov's poor performances in some matches, particularly his blunder in the Champions League game against Werder Bremen on 31 October 2006, provoked a negative campaign among Levski supporters who associated his career with protection from his influential father.

Liverpool 
In June 2007, he almost joined ACF Fiorentina, but was instead transferred to Liverpool on a three-year contract, with an option for a further two years.

Mihaylov was acquired by Liverpool as a talent, whom might become their first team keeper in the future. As at that time Liverpool's first choice keeper was Pepe Reina with Charles Itandje as back up. And by 14 July it became clear that the transfer had hit a problem; Mihaylov would not qualify for a British work permit. As a consequence the Bulgarian U-21 International joined FC Twente on a one-year loan.
At FC Twente 19-year-old Mihaylov was to compete with Sander Boschker and Cees Paauwe for first team action. Although not playing any matches for the first team, Twente did recognize his talent and in 2008 they extended his loan with a year to August 2009.

Twente 
On 27 August 2008, Mihaylov made his debut for FC Twente in their 4–0 defeat to Arsenal at the Emirates Stadium in the second leg of the third qualifying round for the UEFA Champions League and went on to make his Eredivisie debut in a 1–1 draw at Roda on 30 August 2008. On 14 March 2009, Mihaylov made his second appearance for Twente in the Dutch league against Willem II, playing the full 90 minutes and earning himself a booking, managing to keep a clean sheet in Twente's 2–0 away win. On 29 July 2009, Mihaylov came on as a substitute for midfielder Kenneth Perez, following the dismissal of starting keeper Sander Boschker in the 27th minute of Twente's away game against Sporting CP in the first leg of the UEFA Champions League third qualifying round. He stopped the penalty taken by João Moutinho and made a number of key saves to keep the scores level at 0–0. Mihaylov played the full 90 minutes in the return leg and was not at fault for the Portuguese side's last-minute equalizing goal, which allowed Sporting CP to advance on the away goals rule.

FC Twente had become impressed with Mihaylov, not only his talent, but also his progress convinced them. And after several years of being loaned out to Twente, on 5 February 2010 he officially was transferred for a fee of €1.8 million from Liverpool to Twente. He signed a contract for three years with the Dutch club.

In the 2010–11 season, he established himself as the starting goalkeeper for Twente. Having played in the Champions League, Mihaylov impressed with great appearances in the competition that season, among others by stopping a penalty-shot. In the Champions League FC Twente drew to play against his "nightmare" club Werder Bremen, as it were mentioned by the Bulgarian media. He only conceded one goal in the two matches played against Werder. With further appearances against Tottenham Hotspur and the previous year's Champions League winner Inter Milan in the group, Twente managed on their debut in the Champions League nevertheless to end at third place, allowing continuation in the UEFA Europa League. Twente was defeated in the quarterfinals by Villarreal, after having defeated Rubin Kazan and Zenit Saint Petersburg.

Mihaylov was quoted saying that Liverpool now had retained an option to buy him back from Twente, as he had played enough games for his native country's national team to qualify for a work permit.

On 23 December 2011, Mihaylov attended a ceremony in Sofia, where he was honoured with the Bulgarian Footballer of the Year award (Stiliyan Petrov and Dimitar Berbatov came second and third respectively). The last Bulgarian goalkeeper to have received this distinction is his father Borislav.

Mersin 
Mihaylov signed for Turkish club Mersin İdmanyurdu on 1 September 2014 on a two-year contract as a free agent. He made his debut in a 3–0 home win over Kemer Tekirovaspor in the Turkish Cup on 29 September. His Süper Lig debut came on 22 November, in a 2–2 away draw against Akhisar Belediyespor. On 27 December, Mihaylov played his second league game in a 1–0 loss against Fenerbahçe at Şükrü Saracoğlu Stadium, in which he saved a penalty from Diego.

Omonia 
In December 2017, Mihaylov signed a contract with Cypriot club Omonia until the end of the season.

Return to Levski Sofia 
On 26 November 2018, Mihaylov returned to Levski Sofia, signing a contract till the end of the season with an option to be extended for two more years. He quickly became the first choice goalkeeper, but lost his status shortly after the arrival of Milan Mijatović. He regained his place for the first half of season 2020-21 due to Mijatović's departure in the summer of 2020.

International career 
Mihaylov made his senior international debut in the 5–1 defeat by Scotland
in the Kirin Cup in Japan in May 2006. On 12 August 2009, he earned his second cap, playing the full 90 minutes in a friendly match against Latvia, which Bulgaria won 1–0. Mihaylov did well to parry a dangerous Vitālijs Astafjevs shot in the second half, but was hardly tested during the game. He earned his third cap on 10 October 2009, after replacing the injured Dimitar Ivankov in the 1–4 away loss to Cyprus in a World Cup qualifier. Mihaylov was the starting goalkeeper for Bulgaria during the country's first two reasonably unsuccessful Euro 2012 qualifiers. He played as the main custodian for Bulgaria during the 2014 World Cup qualifiers, while Vladislav Stoyanov was selected for the last two matches - against Armenia and the Czech Republic.

Career statistics

Honours

Club 
Levski Sofia
 A Group: 2005–06, 2006–07
 Bulgarian Cup: 2004–05, 2021–22
 Bulgarian Supercup: 2005

Twente
 Eredivisie: 2009–10
 Johan Cruijff Shield: 2010, 2011
 KNVB Cup: 2011

Individual 
 Bulgarian Footballer of the Year: 2011
 Dutch Football Goalkeeper of the Year: 2011

References

External links 

 

Player profile at Voetbal International 

Profile at LevskiSofia.info

1988 births
Living people
Footballers from Sofia
Bulgarian footballers
Bulgaria international footballers
Bulgaria under-21 international footballers
Association football goalkeepers
PFC Levski Sofia players
Liverpool F.C. players
FC Twente players
Hellas Verona F.C. players
Mersin İdman Yurdu footballers
AC Omonia players
First Professional Football League (Bulgaria) players
Eredivisie players
Süper Lig players
Cypriot First Division players
Bulgarian expatriate footballers
Bulgarian expatriate sportspeople in England
Expatriate footballers in England
Bulgarian expatriate sportspeople in the Netherlands
Expatriate footballers in the Netherlands
Expatriate footballers in Italy
Expatriate footballers in Turkey
Expatriate footballers in Cyprus